In enzymology, a 2,4-diaminopentanoate dehydrogenase is an enzyme that catalyzes the chemical reaction

2,4-diaminopentanoate + H2O + NAD(P)+  2-amino-4-oxopentanoate + NH3 + NAD(P)H + H+

The 4 substrates of this enzyme are 2,4-diaminopentanoate, H2O, NAD+, and NADP+, whereas its 5 products are 2-amino-4-oxopentanoate, NH3, NADH, NADPH, and H+.

This enzyme belongs to the family of oxidoreductases, specifically those acting on the CH-NH2 group of donors with NAD+ or NADP+ as acceptor.  The systematic name of this enzyme class is 2,4-diaminopentanoate:NAD(P)+ oxidoreductase (deaminating). This enzyme is also called 2,4-diaminopentanoic acid C4 dehydrogenase.  This enzyme participates in 3 metabolic pathways: lysine degradation, arginine and proline metabolism, and d-arginine and d-ornithine metabolism.

References

 
 
 

EC 1.4.1
NADPH-dependent enzymes
NADH-dependent enzymes
Enzymes of unknown structure